Robert Kühner (15 March 1903 in Paris – 27 February 1996 in Lyon) was a French mycologist most notable for reviewing many forms of agaric (mushroom fungus) genera.

He studied at the Sorbonne, afterwards from 1921 until 1932, he was working as a high school teacher in Lille. Then from 1938 till 1973, he was associated with the Faculty of Sciences at Lyon.

He was honoured in 1946, with Kuehneromyces, which is a genus of fungi in the family Strophariaceae.

Selected works 
 Contribution à l'étude des hyménomycètes et spécialement des agaricacés, 1926 - Contribution to the study of Hymenomycetes and especially of Agaricales. 
 Le genre Galera (Fries) Quélet, 1935 - The genus Galera (Fries) Quélet.
 Le genre Mycena (Fries) Étude cytologique et systématique des espèces d'Europe et d'Amérique du Nord, 1938 - The genus Mycena (Fries), cytological and systematic studies of species native to Europe and North America.
 Flore analytique des champignons supérieurs (agarics, bolets, chanterelles), 1953 -  Analysis of major mushrooms (agarics, boletes, chanterelles).
 Compléments à la "Flore analytique, 1954 - Additions to the "Flora analytique". 
 Agaricales de la zone alpine: Amanitacées, 1972 - Agaricales of the Alpine zone: Amanitaceae.

References

1903 births
1996 deaths
French mycologists
Academic staff of the University of Lyon
20th-century French botanists